The G Spot is the sixth studio album by American R&B singer Gerald Levert. It was released by Elektra Records on October 15, 2002 in the United States.

Critical reception

In his review for AllMusic, Jonathan Widran wrote that "this modern R&B stalwart has always offered the perfect blend of dreamy old-school soul textures; jangly, guitar-driven atmospheres; and slick, modern funk grooves. And oh, that voice – mellow and sexy, seductive to the core. The best 'come to beddy bye' tone since Barry White, and so steeped in that era."

Track listing 

Sample credits
"The Top of My Head" contains an interpolation of "Hollywood", written by L. Fischer and D. Wolinski.
"All That Matters" contains an interpolation of "Family Reunion", written by K. Gamble and L. Huff.

Charts

Weekly charts

Year-end charts

References

2002 albums
Gerald Levert albums